The men's rings competition was one of eight events for male competitors in artistic gymnastics at the 1968 Summer Olympics in Mexico City. There were 117 competitors from 28 nations, with nations in the team competition having up to 6 gymnasts and other nations entering up to 3 gymnasts. The event was won by Akinori Nakayama of Japan, the nation's second consecutive victory in the rings event. Mikhail Voronin took silver to extend the Soviet Union's podium streak in the event to five Games, while Sawao Kato of Japan finished with bronze.

Background

This was the 12th appearance of the event, which is one of the five apparatus events held every time there were apparatus events at the Summer Olympics (no apparatus events were held in 1900, 1908, 1912, or 1920). Two of the six finalists from 1964 returned: silver medalist Franco Menichelli of Italy and sixth-place finisher Yukio Endō of Japan. Menichelli had finished third at the 1966 World Championships behind Mikhail Voronin of the Soviet Union and Akinori Nakayama of Japan.

Ecuador and the Philippines each made their debut in the men's rings; East and West Germany competed separately for the first time. The United States made its 11th appearance, most of any nation, having missed only the inaugural 1896 Games.

Competition format

Each nation entered a team of six gymnasts or up to three individual gymnasts. All entrants in the gymnastics competitions performed both a compulsory exercise and a voluntary exercise for each apparatus. The scores for all 12 exercises were summed to give an individual all-around score.

These exercise scores were also used for qualification for the new apparatus finals. The two exercises (compulsory and voluntary) for each apparatus were summed to give an apparatus score; the top 6 in each apparatus participated in the finals; others were ranked 7th through 117th. In the final, each gymnast performed an additional voluntary exercise; half of the score from the preliminary carried over.

Schedule

All times are Central Standard Time (UTC-6)

Results

References

Official Olympic Report
www.gymnasticsresults.com
www.gymn-forum.net

Men's rings
Men's 1968
Men's events at the 1968 Summer Olympics